In Greek mythology, Pelops (Greek: Πέλοψ "dark eyes" or "dark face", derived from pelios 'dark' and ops 'face, eye') was a son of Agamemnon and Cassandra.  This Pelops, carrying the ancestral name (after his great-grandfather Pelops, king of Pisa) and his twin brother Teledamus (destined to have been "far-ruling"), the very emblems of the Pelopides, were murdered in their infancy by the usurper Aegisthus.

Note

References 

 Pausanias, Description of Greece with an English Translation by W.H.S. Jones, Litt.D., and H.A. Ormerod, M.A., in 4 Volumes. Cambridge, MA, Harvard University Press; London, William Heinemann Ltd. 1918. . Online version at the Perseus Digital Library
 Pausanias, Graeciae Descriptio. 3 vols. Leipzig, Teubner. 1903.  Greek text available at the Perseus Digital Library.

Children of Agamemnon
Princes in Greek mythology